Phryneta bulbifera is a species of beetle in the family Cerambycidae. It was described by Hermann Julius Kolbe in 1894, originally under the genus Phrystola. It is known from the Democratic Republic of the Congo and Cameroon.

References

Phrynetini
Beetles described in 1894
Taxa named by Hermann Julius Kolbe